Marcy Field  is a public-use airport located two nautical miles (3.7 km) south of the central business district of Keene, a town in Essex County, New York, United States. It is owned by the Town of Keene. The airport is situated on the west side of the Ausable River.

Facilities and aircraft 
It has one runway designated N/S with a turf surface measuring 2,390 by 95 feet (728 x 29 m). For the 12-month period ending May 20, 2010, the airport had 135 aircraft operations, an average of 11 per month: 89% general aviation and 11% military.

References

External links 
  airport diagram from New York State DOT
 Aerial image as of 7 May 1995 from USGS The National Map
 

Airports in New York (state)
Transportation buildings and structures in Essex County, New York
Adirondacks